A county board is a common form of county legislature, particular of counties in the United States.

Related forms of county government include:
 Board of Supervisors — a form of county legislature in some U.S. states
 County commission, also called a board of county commissioners — a form of county administration in some U.S. states
 County council — a form of county legislature in some countries

Forms unique to a single state include:
 Police jury — the most common form of legislature in parishes of Louisiana
 Board of Chosen Freeholders — the county legislature in each county of New Jersey
 Fiscal court — Same in Kentucky

See also
 County executive
 Local government in the United States

County governing bodies in the United States